The 1954 Major League Baseball All-Star Game was the 21st playing of the midsummer classic between the all-stars of the American League (AL) and National League (NL), the two leagues comprising Major League Baseball. The game was held on July 13, 1954, at Cleveland Municipal Stadium in Cleveland, Ohio, the home of the Cleveland Indians of the American League.

Summary
The American League rallied in the bottom of the eighth inning, to defeat the National League in an 11–9 slugfest at Cleveland Stadium. Both teams combined for an All-Star Game record 20 runs, on 31 hits, which included six home runs. Al Rosen led the American League offense, going 3-for-4 with two home runs and five runs batted in.

Starters Whitey Ford (AL) and Robin Roberts (NL) matched zeroes until the third inning, when the American League hitters stacked themselves to an early 4–0 lead in the bottom of the inning. Minnie Miñoso opened the frame with a single and Nellie Fox walked, while Roberts struck out Mickey Mantle and retired Yogi Berra on a grounder, but could not overcome a three-run homer by Rosen to make it a 3–0 game. Ray Boone followed with a homer before Roberts retired Hank Bauer.

Opening the fourth inning, the National League rallied for five runs to take a 5–4 lead. Sandy Consuegra retired the first batter he faced, but Duke Snider, Ted Kluszewski and Ray Jablonski hit consecutive singles and Jackie Robinson a double, tying the game at four. Bob Lemon relieved Consuegra, but gave up a two-out, RBI-double by the pinch-hitter Don Mueller before retiring Granny Hamner for the third out.

Meanwhile,  Chico Carrasquel kept the American League attack alive with a lead-off single in the bottom of the fourth against Johnny Antonelli. Carrasquel moved to third on a one-out single by Miñoso and scored on a sacrifice fly by Beto Ávila, tying the score at five.

The National League picked up two more two-out runs off Bob Porterfield in the fifth to pull back in front, 7–5, after a single by Snider and a two-run homer by Kluszewski. In the bottom of the inning, Berra hit a single off Antonelli and Rosen belted his second home run of the game to tie the score at seven.

The American League regained the lead in the sixth, 8–7, with an RBI-single by Avila off Warren Spahn that brought home Williams.

In the eighth inning, the National League bats stayed hot against Bob Keegan. Willie Mays singled and Gus Bell unloaded it with a pinch-hit, two-run homer to put again away the game, 9–8. Dean Stone came in relief  with two outs and Red Schoendienst running on third. Schoendienst attempted to steal home and was thrown out by Stone. This third out set the stage for Larry Doby, who pinch hit for Stone with one out in the bottom of the inning and tied the game with a home run against Gene Conley, becoming the first black player to hit a home run in an All-Star Game. After that, Mantle and Berra singled and Rosen walked to load the bases. Carl Erskine replaced Conley and retired Mickey Vernon for the second out, but gave up a two-RBI single to Fox that sealed the 11–9 victory for the American League.

The American League (7) and the National League (6) used 13 pitchers in the game. Stone took the win (without retiring a batter) and Conley was tagged with the loss while Virgil Trucks earned the save. Trucks walked Snider to open the ninth inning, but retired Stan Musial, Gil Hodges and Randy Jackson for the last three outs of the game.

The win broke a four-game All-Star losing streak for the American League. After this game, the AL led the all-time All-Star Series 13–8.

Notes
 The 20 runs scored in the contest set an All-Star Game record which lasted until 1998, when the American League defeated the National League, 13–8, at Coors Field.
 Al Rosen became the third player to hit two home runs in an All-Star Game. Arky Vaughan did it in 1941, and  Ted Williams did it in 1946. This feat would be matched later by Willie McCovey in 1969 and Gary Carter in 1981.
 This was only the second Midsummer Classic to date with more than sixty-thousand fans in attendance (69,751). The first occurred during the 1935 All-Star Game, which was also held at Cleveland Municipal Stadium (69,812).
This is the only All-Star Game to date in which one of the managers—in this case Walter Alston—was in his first year of managing the defending league champions he represented.  Alston was managing in place of his predecessor as manager of the Brooklyn Dodgers, Charlie Dressen.

Opening lineups

Rosters
Players in italics have since been inducted into the National Baseball Hall of Fame.

Umpires

Line Score

Play-by-play at Retrosheet

References

External links
Baseball Almanac
Baseball Reference
IMDb.com

Major League Baseball All-Star Game
Major League Baseball All-Star Game
Baseball competitions in Cleveland
Major League Baseball All Star Game
Major League Baseball All-Star Game
1950s in Cleveland